A Little Man and a House and the Whole World Window is the debut studio album by the English rock band Cardiacs. It was released on 21 March 1988 in the United Kingdom by their own label the Alphabet Business Concern and in the Netherlands by Torso Records. Its single "Is This the Life" saw brief chart success due to exposure on mainstream radio, and garnered the attention of a wider audience when it entered the Independent Top 10 in the UK, peaking at number 80.

At the start of March 1987, Cardiacs were accused of incest between Tim and his then wife, and band saxophonist, Sarah Smith by the Sunday Sport tabloid, due to the mistaken belief that the pair were related, with the joke being kept up by the band ever since. Sessions for the album began in 1985 at The Workhouse Studios with the songs "There's Too Many Irons in the Fire" and "All Spectacular" being released as a double A-side single in August 1987 and left off the LP, only appearing on deluxe Torso releases of the album. They, along with B-side "Loosefish Scapegrace", were recorded at Soft Option Studios and were included on the Songs for Ships and Irons compilation.

The album was loosely conceptualised as a performance by a band of clowns under the tyranny of the Alphabet Business Concern label and the fictional characters of the Consultant and Miss Swift, an idea that was conceived on the Seaside Treats video. The band re-recorded many tracks from their previous album, The Seaside, this time with a larger budget and better studio equipment. With manager Mark Walmesley and engineer Graham Simmonds (previously a Cardiacs member), the group coloured much of the recordings with sound effects and orchestration, as exemplified on "A Little Man and a House", "The Breakfast Line" and "Victory Egg". Recording was completed in 1987.

Background 

By 1984, Cardiacs had donned a clown aesthetic with suits and smeared make-up. According to Tim Smith, "we were not aware that we looked strange back then. The strange suits and make-up we wore in those days was us just trying to look our best. We read somewhere that pop groups were supposed to look their best so we were told to do it. Maybe we got it a bit wrong." In August 1986, two years after finishing the album The Seaside, the group recorded the live album Rude Bootleg at Little John's Farm, featuring many previously unreleased songs. Studio versions of two tracks from the show, along with three new songs, were released on an extended play titled Big Ship the next year. The band were receiving skeptical reception from critics whilst garnering more attention from their appearance on Channel 4's The Tube.

The publication in the UK of Smith's remarks about him and his wife "sharing the same mum and bed" then embroiled the band on controversy when the story was published in the Sunday Sport. Kingston Police reportedly investigated the claims, but it is believed to have been a publicity stunt, with label representatives keeping up the incestuous narrative. The tabloid writer Madeleine Pallas writes:

During that time, members Marguerite Johnson and Graham Simmonds left the band. Johnson reportedly went missing in 1984, though it was likely said as satire. The same year, the group worked on other projects. Tim Smith, Sarah Smith and William D. Drake formed the group Mr and Mrs Smith and Mr Drake, releasing the album of the same name. Smith also produced, directed and acted in the short film Seaside Treats and played brass with his wife on the Sound's third EP Shock of Daylight.

Inspiration and conception 
Whilst recording the Seaside album, Smith started writing longer, more theatrical compositions, inspired by the likes of the Red Krayola, Devo, Frank Zappa and Slapp Happy. According to music journalist Sean Kitching, this initiation into avant-garde afforded Cardiacs some of the "most sublime and effortlessly happy moments" that defined the group's next project, A Little Man and a House and the Whole World Window. The addition of keyboardist William D. Drake in the lineup also revamped the Cardiacs sound, along with Smith taking over vocals after Mark Cawthra left in 1983. Smith's war-related lyrics in songs such as "Hope Day" were expanded upon in "Loosefish Scapegrace", a song that provided an anthemic theme to introduce the new album to fans, as well as "Victory Egg" (originally titled "Victory"), a song about the First World War. Smith and Drake co-wrote the songs "I'm Eating in Bed" and the album closer "The Whole World Window". Smith wrote the album's interlude in his youth, when he was about 13 years old. Many tracks from the album were previously released in other forms. The songs "A Little Man and a House", "R.E.S.", and "Is This the Life" were re-recorded from the Seaside demo album, with the latter originating from Toy World. The songs "The Icing on the World", "In a City Lining", "I'm Eating in Bed" and "The Whole World Window" were first released on the Rude Bootleg live album.

In 1985, the Seaside Treats video album introduced the concept of the Alphabet Business Concern label having tyrannical power over the band. The idea involved two fictional members of Cardiacs' management, who were named "the Consultant" and "Miss Swift". The former was portrayed by James Stevens, with the characters appearing in Cardiacs live shows until 1989. They were characterised with opposing personalities, with Swift being courteous and sensitive, and the Consultant being loud and overbearing. Smith's marriage to Sarah in 1983 was credited to the Consultant as a punishment to cover up the Sunday Sport scandal, despite it not making sense chronologically. They, along with Cardiacs manager Mark Walmesley, provided vocals for the album.

Recording and production 

Sessions began in 1985 at The Workhouse Studios (formerly Maximum Sound Studios), marking the first time that Cardiacs had done a proper studio recording. The studio loaned the band £40,000 to record the album, which they finished two years later in 1987. After the Workhouse sessions, they recorded "There's Too Many Irons in the Fire", followed by two other songs: "All Spectecular" and "Loosefish Scapegrace", the sessions for which took place in Soft Option Studios.

"There's Too Many Irons in the Fire" and "All Spectacular" were subsequently released as a double A-side in August 1987. The songs were excluded from A Little Man, only included on the Torso deluxe CD and the compilation album Songs for Ships and Irons. A re-recording of the song "Is This the Life" was released as a single in March 1988, managing to chart due to exposure on mainstream radio, peaking at number 80 in the UK. It remains the most famous track by the band, featuring the B-sides "Goosegash" and "I'm Eating in Bed".

The album was produced by Smith.

Releases, availability and reissues 

A Little Man and a House and the Whole World Window was originally released on vinyl LP and cassette by the band's record label Alphabet Business Concern, on 21 March 1988. It was subsequently released on CD by the Dutch record label Torso Records with five bonus tracks added – the three tracks from the previous "There's Too Many Irons in the Fire" single ("There's Too Many Irons in the Fire", "All Spectacular" and "Loosefish Scapegrace") plus the B-side tracks from the "Is This the Life" 12" single ("Goosegash" and "I'm Eating in Bed"). Alphabet released a number of CDs which were actually the Dutch Torso Records version (TORSO CD060), with an Alphabet album number sticker over the Torso release (although the CD has the Torso number printed on it.)

The album was reissued on CD in 1995 (along with the rest of the band's back catalogue) by Alphabet Business Concern. The track listing on this release followed the original vinyl and cassette track listing and removed all of the bonus tracks, with the exception of "I'm Eating in Bed" which was reinstated as the album's third track in accordance with the wishes of the band.

After a long period of unavailability, the album was re-pressed in August 2007 and is available on the band's official website.

Critical reception 

In New Musical Express, reviewer Jack O'Neill savaged the album for what he perceived to be its retrospective musical approach and (in his opinion) unwelcome leanings towards progressive rock. "Just when you thought Marillion had taken us to the very limit along comes this schizo-progressive anachronism wherein the Cardiacs have telescoped the entire dreggs of the early seventies into one album so geriatric, by comparison that the next Blue Öyster Cult will sound as fresh as Viva Hate. It is the Floyd, it is Genesis, it is King Crimson, does it matter? A Little Man... is the very worst bits of Tommy stretched out to an eternity; it's Emerson, Lake & Palmer; it's Brain Salad Burglary as the NME of its day might have said. By way of variation 'In a City Lining' knocks off one of those Neil Young/Mission cryogenic guitar solos and to bewilder us completely there is a nutty body-stomp midway through "Is This the Life" which resides about as comfortable as Ian Paisley in the Vatican. Cardiacs are the sound of both feet in the grave."

Over time, critical reception changed significantly towards a positive view of the album, and the album has become recognized as a somewhat unrecognized milestone, and predecessor to Cardiacs Magnum Opus Sing to God (1996). Writing for The Quietus, Kitching stated "Cardiacs music is fuelled by love and laughter and by awe in the diversity of creation. It is grandiloquent in the way that certain classical music is - particularly the work of Charles Ives - often with several harmonies and melodies developing and converging within the structure of a single song. It can be as simple and beautiful as a budding flower, or as grandiose and multifaceted as the most baroque of architecture."

Track listing

Personnel 
Cardiacs

 Tim Smith – lead vocals, guitar, flute and recorder
 Jim Smith – bass guitar and vocals
 Sarah Smith – saxophone, clarinets, recorder and vocals
 William D. Drake – keyboards and vocals
 Tim Quy – marimba, percussion and Synthesiser
 Dominic Luckman – drums

Additional musicians

 Ashley Slater – tenor and bass trombones
 Phil Cesar – trumpet, flugelhorn and soprano trumpet
 Elaine Herman – violin
 The Consultant, Miss Swift and Mark Walmesley – vocals

Production

 Tim Smith – producer
 Pete Hammond – executive producer
 Graham Simmonds, Pete Hammond, Roger Tebbutt, Spencer Henderson and Stuart Barry – engineer
 Maxwell Anandappa – plating

Release history

Notes

References

External links 

 

1988 debut albums
Cardiacs albums